Mária Fazekas (born 2 August 1975) is a Hungarian table tennis player. She competed in the women's singles event at the 2004 Summer Olympics.

References

External links
 

1975 births
Living people
Hungarian female table tennis players
Olympic table tennis players of Hungary
Table tennis players at the 2004 Summer Olympics
Table tennis players from Budapest
Table tennis players at the 2020 Summer Olympics